

The Global Forum for Combating Antisemitism is an international gathering for assessing the state of antisemitism globally and formulating effective forms of societal and governmental response. The forum is a project of the Israel Ministry of Foreign Affairs.

The first forum took place in 2004 and has since taken place every two to three years in Jerusalem. The Sixth Global Forum for Combating Antisemitism was held from 15-21 of March 2018. This forum  was held in cooperation with the Israel Ministry for Diaspora Affairs.

The 2018 forum focused on the continuing challenge of web antisemitism and cyberhate, 1500 participants, along with senior government ministers, from Israel, Europe and Latin America attended the forum.

Statements adopted by various Global Forums
At the 5th GFCA, in 2015, a document confronting Cyberhate and Online Antisemitism in Europe were signed. During the 6th GFCA, in 2018, Israeli Justice Minister, Ayelet Shaked, co-signed a joint statement on Countering online Hate Speech and Incitement to Violence and Terrorism, along with the Justice Ministers of Italy, Malta, and the Hellenic Republic. This joint statement recognised freedom of expression as a fundamental right of a democratic society which has been enhanced by the technology of the internet; it noted however that internet companies needed to do more to combat and differentiate between freedom of expression and hate speech.

Attendees
Key attendees of the GFCA in 2013 include:

Key attendees of the GFCA in 2015 included:

Key attendees of the GFCA in 2018 included:

References

Israel based opposition to antisemitism
International conferences
Political conferences
Annual events
Diplomatic conferences